The Multilateral Interoperability Programme (MIP) is an effort to deliver an assured capability for interoperability of information to support multinational, combined and joint operations. The MIP goal is to support all levels from corps to battalion. MIP's focus is on command and control systems.  MIP is a consortium of 29 NATO and Non-NATO nations that meet quarterly to define interoperability specifications for the exchange information between their national Command and Control systems.

Overview
The Multilateral Interoperability Programme referred to as MIP, is an interoperability organisation established by national Command and Control Information Systems (C2IS) developers with a requirement to share relevant Command and Control  information in a multinational or coalition environment. 
As a result of collaboration within the programme, MIP produces a set of specifications which when implemented by the nations, provide the required interoperability capability. 
MIP provides a venue for system level interoperability testing of national MIP implementations as well as providing a forum for exchanging information relevant to national implementation and fielding plans to enable synchronization. 
MIP is NOT empowered to direct how nations develop their own C2IS.

The MIP meetings are held in Greding, Bavaria, Germany.

The NATO Data Administration Group (NDAG) cooperates with the MIP in building the Joint Consultation, Command and Control Information Exchange Data Model (JC3IEDM).

C2IEDM
The C2IEDM (the predecessor to the JC3IEDM), or Command and Control Information Exchange Data Model, is a data model that is managed by the Multilateral Interoperability Programme (MIP). It originated with experts from various NATO partners and from the Partnership for Peace nations. This data model is in the process of being submitted to Object Management Group (OMG) for consideration as the standard for Information exchange. It falls under the shared operational picture exchange service.

JC3IEDM
The Joint Command, Control and Consultation Information Exchange Data Model is first and foremost an information exchange data model. The model can also serve as a coherent basis for other information exchange mechanisms, such as message formats, currently lacking a unified information structure.  It is the most current evolution in a long line of data model as far back as the Generic Hub GH.  JC3IEDM is intended to represent the core of the data identified for exchange across multiple functional areas and multiple views of the requirements. Toward that end, it lays down a common approach to describing the information to be exchanged in a command and control (C2) environment.  The JC3IEDM has recently been updated to include Improvised Explosive Devices (IED) and Irregular Actors (IA).

MIP Members
The Full members are:  
Canada, Denmark, France, Germany, Italy, the Netherlands, Norway, Spain, Sweden, Turkey, the United Kingdom, the United States.

The Associated members are: 
Australia, Austria, Belgium, Croatia, the Czech Republic, Estonia, Finland, Greece, Hungary, Lithuania, New Zealand, Poland, Portugal, Romania, Slovakia, Slovenia, South Africa, Switzerland, Ukraine, as well as Allied Command Transformation.

References

External links
MIP Public Home (deprecated)
MIP Public Home (new test site)
Website MIM

NATO standardisation
United States Department of Defense agencies
Data modeling